Brenda Miller (born 1941) is an American post-minimalist visual artist. She has shown her work in the 1973 Whitney Biennial, as well as eight exhibitions at the Museum of Modern Art. Born in the Bronx, she studied at Parsons and University of New Mexico, and received and MFA from Tulane University in 1967, before moving back to New York City. She received three National Endowment for the Arts Fellowships (1976, 1979, and 1987). Her work is in the collections of the Smithsonian American Art Museum, Whitney Museum of American Art, Museum Boijmans Van Beuningen, and the Harvard Art Museums.

References 

1941 births
Living people
Artists from New York (state)
20th-century American women artists
Parsons School of Design alumni
University of New Mexico alumni
Tulane University alumni
21st-century American women